Ben Ashenden is a British-Irish actor, writer and comedian. He is half of the double-act, The Pin, with Alexander Owen, with whom he has made four series for BBC Radio 4, picking up nominations at the 2017 Writers' Guild Awards. and Radio Academy Awards, and winning the BBC Radio Award for Best Comedy.

Early life 
Ashenden was born in Watford, Hertfordshire, and grew up in Radlett. His father is a builder and his mother is a bookseller. He has one sister. He went to the Haberdashers' Aske's School for Boys and performed with the Chicken Shed Theatre Company before studying English Literature at  Trinity Hall, Cambridge.

Career 
Ashenden met his double-act colleague, Alexander Owen, at the University of Cambridge. They co-wrote/performed (with Joey Batey, Joe Bannister, Mark Fiddaman and Simon Haines) the sketch show ‘Good Clean Men’. Ashenden and Owen then performed with the Cambridge Footlights, as part of the first troupe to tour America, in a show directed by Liam Williams and Daran Johnson.

Upon graduation the pair took their sketch act, The Pin, to the Edinburgh Fringe. Their most recent show, The Pin: Backstage, was described by The Guardian as “one of Edinburgh’s most dazzling comedy shows”, and is now in development with Sonia Friedman Productions].

As an actor, his film credits include Bridget Jones Baby, Sulphur and White, and Horrible Histories: The Movie. His TV credits include Avenue 5 (HBO), The English Game (Netflix), W1A (BBC1), Stath Lets Flats (C4), Brotherhood (Comedy Central), Plebs (ITV2) and Sky Christmas special, Cinderella: After Ever After.

As a writer, he co-created the animated series Oi, Leonardo! for BBC3, and has written for BBC1 shows Walliams and Friend and Tracey Ullman's Show, BBC3's Famalam], and Showtime’s Who is America?

In 2020 The Pin released “The Special Relationship” an 8-part series on Audible, co-starring Fred Armisen, Cecily Strong, Jamie Demetriou, Lolly Adefope and Kate Berlant. It largely repurposes sketches from their Radio 4 show within the context of a fictionalised attempt to break into the New York comedy scene.

Filmography

Film

Television

Stage

Awards and nominations

References

External links 
 
 The Pin on Twitter.
 Ben Ashenden on Hamilton Hodell.
 The Pin official website.
 The Pin on Radio 4.

British male film actors
British male stage actors
British male television actors
British male comedians
Living people
1989 births